Alexandru Ioan Iliuciuc (born August 28, 1977) is a Romanian former football player who played as a goalkeeper and currently the coach of Mirbat Sports Club.

Degrees
 UEFA A
 UEFA B
 Bachelor in Physical Studies and Sport Education from the Faculty of Physical Sport Studies and Education

Personal life
Alex Iliuciuc speaks fluent Romanian and English. He can also understand French and Arabic.

External links
 
 Catalin Anghel
 Farul vrea jucatorii campioanei
 Milos Deletic, dubla pentru Sageata in victoria de la Dorohoi
 Selecţionata Under 16 a judeţului Galaţi, pusă pe fapte mari
 Săgeata a murit, dar revine la Comisie
 Săgeata Năvodari a reziliat contractele celor trei antrenori
 Sichitiu face istorie in Arabia Saudita
 Continuăm serialul adresat părinţilor, cu informaţii utile despre cluburile sportive
 PROBLEME LA FARUL ȘI SĂGEATA înainte de meciurile de mâine din Liga a 2-a. FC Farul – CS Balotești se joacă la Constanța. Săgeata o înfruntă în deplasare pe FCM Dorohoi

1977 births
Living people
Sportspeople from Galați
Romanian footballers
Association football goalkeepers
Liga I players
Liga II players
FCM Dunărea Galați players
CSM Ceahlăul Piatra Neamț players
FCV Farul Constanța players
FC Dinamo București players
ASC Oțelul Galați players
FC UTA Arad players
CSM Jiul Petroșani players
FC Gloria Buzău players
AFC Dacia Unirea Brăila players
ACS Sticla Arieșul Turda players
Romanian football managers
Romanian expatriate football managers
Dhofar Club managers
Romanian expatriate sportspeople in Saudi Arabia
Expatriate football managers in Saudi Arabia
Romanian expatriate sportspeople in Oman
Expatriate football managers in Oman
Romanian expatriate sportspeople in Zambia
Expatriate football managers in Zambia
Romanian expatriate sportspeople in Qatar